Aleksandr Nikolayevich Rozenberg (born 18 October 1967) is a Transnistrian politician serving as the Prime Minister of Transnistria since 30 May 2022.

Biography 
Aleksandr Rozenberg was born on 18 October 1967 in Ladyzhyn, present day Ukraine. He graduated from the Pridnestrovian Energy College in 1986 with a degree in electrical engineering and from the State Agrarian University of Moldova with a similar degree in 1994. He began his career working on a state farm in 1986, and then worked as the Minister of Justice.

In March 2012, Rozenberg began to run a local bakery in the Transnistrian capital of Tiraspol. He later became the Transnistrian Minister of Agriculture and Natural Resources on 20 January 2022, and served until his appointment as Prime Minister of Transnistria on 27 May 2022 by President Vadim Krasnoselsky, following the resignation of Aleksandr Martynov. The appointment came into effect on 30 May.

References 

1967 births
Prime Ministers of Transnistria
Living people
People from Ladyzhyn